The 2001 CAF Cup was the 10th edition of the CAF Cup, the African continental club competition for runners up of the respective domestic leagues. It was won by Algerian team JS Kabylie who beat Étoile Sportive du Sahel of Tunisia on the away goals rule in the final, after the two teams finished level on aggregate 2-2. It was the second year in a row that JS Kabylie's won the competition after also winning the 2000 edition.

First round

|}
1 Simba FC withdrew before first leg
2 First leg abandoned with the score 3-0 due to poor visibility. CAF disqualified Mongomo for arriving late and delaying kick-off.
Five teams received a bye : JS Kabylie (Algeria), Goldfields (Ghana), Africa Sport (Ivory Coast), Wydad Casablanca (Morocco), Étoile du Sahel (Tunisia)

Second round

|}
1 Katsina United did not show up for second leg

Quarter-finals

|}

Semi-finals

|}

Étoile du Sahel won 3–1 on aggregate and advanced to the final.

3-3 on aggregate, JS Kabylie won on away goals rule and advanced to the final.

Finals

|}

First Leg

Second Leg

2–2 on aggregate, JS Kabylie won on away goals rule

Champions

See also
2001 CAF Champions League
CAF Cup

External links
Results at RSSSF.com
Results at SportScheduler

2001
3